Prem Lata Katiyar is an Indian politician and former cabinet minister in Government of Uttar Pradesh.

Life
She has been  MLA From Kalyanpur Vidhansabha five times and Minister three times. She is the Vice-President of Bharatiya Janata Party Uttar Pradesh unit. She is an ex MLA from Kanpur. She is from Kurmi community. Premlata Katiyar has been a minister in governments in Uttar Pradesh headed by Kalyan Singh, Ram Prakash Gupta, Raj Nath Singh and Kumari Mayawati (when the BSP had a tie-up with the BJP).

Representing Kanpur's Kalyanpur Assembly seat (under which IIT-Kanpur falls) continuously since 1991, this Kurmi leader is not related to a more hard line UP BJP leader named Vinay Katiyar. Premlata's association with the BJP began with the anti-Emergency movement. Her daughter, Neelima Katiyar, is now MLA from Kalyanpur and office-bearer in the state unit of Bharatiya Janata Yuva Morcha.

References

External links 
Story
BJPS

People from Kanpur Nagar district
Bharatiya Janata Party politicians from Uttar Pradesh
Uttar Pradesh MLAs 1991–1993
State cabinet ministers of Uttar Pradesh
1946 births
Living people
Women in Uttar Pradesh politics
20th-century Indian women politicians
20th-century Indian politicians
Women state cabinet ministers of India